Doncaster Rovers is an English football club formed in 1879.

Honours

League
English third tier
Champions: 2012–13
Play-off winners: 2007–08
— Northern half
— Champions: 1934–35, 1946–47, 1949–50
— Runners up: 1937–38, 1938–39

English fourth tier
Champions: 1965–66, 1968–69, 2003–04
Runners up: 1983–84
Promoted: 1980–81, 2016–17

English fifth tier
Play-Off Winners: 2002–03

Midland Football League
Champions: 1896–97, 1898–99
Runners up: 1900–01, 1922–23

Midland Alliance League
Runners up: 1890–91

Yorkshire League
Runners up: 1898–99

Cup
Football League Trophy
2006–07

Sheffield and Hallamshire Senior Cup
1890–91, 1911–12, 2000–01, 2001–02

Sheffield and Hallamshire County Cup
1935–36, 1937–38, 1940–41, 1955–56, 1967–68, 1975–76, 1985–86

Conference Cup
1998–99, 1999–2000

Wharncliffe Charity Cup
1922–23

Club
 Highest overall League finish: 7th (25th overall), Division 2, 1901–02 Season
 Record League victory: 10–0 v Darlington, Division 4, 25 January 1964
 Record cup victory: 7–0 v Blyth Spartans, FA Cup First Round, 27 November 1937 and v Chorley, FA Cup First Round replay, 20 November 2018.
 Record defeat: 0–12 v Small Heath, Division 2, 11 April 1903
 Record home attendance at Belle Vue: 37,149 vs Hull City, Division 3 (N), 2 October 1948
 Record home attendance at Keepmoat Stadium: 15,001 vs Leeds Utd, League 1, 1 April 2008
 Record League points: 92, Division 3, 2003–04
 Record League goals: 123, Division 3 (N), 1946–47
 Longest match:  3 hours 23 minutes (203 minutes) vs. Stockport County, 30 March 1946, also a world record.

Players

Appearances

 Record League appearances: James Coppinger, 607
 Record appearances: James Coppinger, 688
 Most consecutive League appearances: Bert Tindill, 139 (11 September 1948 – 24 November 1951)
 Longest serving: Walter Langton, 18 seasons

Goalscorers
A list of goalscorers who have scored 40 or more total goals. Ordered by total goals, then league goals, then ratios.
.

 Record League goal-scorer: Tom Keetley, 180 league goals (1923 to 1929)
 Record goal-scorer: Tom Keetley, 186 goals in all competitions
 Highest League scorer in a season: Clarrie Jordan, 42 (Division 3 (N), 1946–47)
 Most goals in one match: Tom Keetley, 6 (in 7–4 league win at Ashington, 1928–29)
 Scoring in most consecutive games: Clarrie Jordan, 10 (1946–47)
 Most goals scored in their debut: Arnold Oxspring, 4 against Long Eaton Rangers in the Midland League

Other

 Most international caps while at Rovers: Len Graham (14 caps for Northern Ireland)
 Youngest player: Alick Jeffrey (15 years, 229 days, 1954)
 Oldest player: John Ryan (52 years and 11 months, 2003)
 Record transfer fee paid: Billy Sharp £1,150,000 (to Sheffield United)
 Record fee received: Matthew Mills, £2,000,000 (from Reading)

Inclusion criteria
Statistics includes substitute appearances, but excludes wartime matches. Further information on competitions/seasons which are regarded as eligible for general statistics are provided below.

League stats
League statistics includes data for the following league spells, but not play-off matches:
 Midland Alliance: 1890−91
 Midland Football League: 1891-92 to 1900-01; 1903–04; 1905-06 to 1922-23
 The Yorkshire League: 1897−98 to 1898−99
 Football League: 1901-02 to 1902-03; 1904–05; 1923-24 to 1997-98; 2003-04 to present
 Football Conference: 1998-99 to 2002-03

Total stats
The figures for total statistics includes the League figures together with the following competitions:
 Play-off matches (2002–03 and 2007–08)
 FA Cup; FA Trophy (1998-99 to 2002-03)
 Football League Cup, Football League Trophy (including three seasons as a Conference club 2000-01 to 2002-03), Football League Group Cup (1982–83), Football League Third Division North Cup (1933-34 to 1934-35; 1937–38)
 Conference League Cup (1999-00 to 2000-01)
 Sheffield and Hallamshire FA Minor Challenge Cup
 Sheffield and Hallamshire FA Senior Challenge Cup
 Gainsborough News Charity Cup
 Wharncliffe Charity Cup
 Mexborough Montague Charity Cup
 Friendlies (pre 1890−91 when Doncaster weren't in a league)

NOT included:
 Wartime League matches
 Friendlies (1890−91 onwards)

References

 
 
 Soccerbase stats (use Search for...on left menu and select 'Players' drop down)
 During Doncaster's period in the Conference the database does not include full match stats:
FA Cup Qualifying Round matches do not have line-ups included in the database. This affects a total of 7 matches during the period.
Only one of their FA Trophy games has match line-ups in Soccerbase, namely the original game against Yeovil on 19 February 2002, leaving a total of 9 Trophy matches without line-ups.
 A to Z Doncaster player stats at doncasterrovers.co.uk - Other than league matches appearance data only appears to include FA Cup and Football League Cup matches (the latter do not seem to be present for seasons 1993-94 to 1997-98). Play-off statistics are included, but are listed within the 'League' totals.
 Surnames A to C
 Surnames D to F
 Surnames G to J
 Surnames K to M
 Surnames N to R
 Surnames S to T
 Surnames U to W
 
 Appearances, goals and club years stats at since1888.co.uk Michael Joyce (site no longer active)

External links
 Official website
 Doncaster Rovers club and player records and statistics at Statto.com

 
Doncaster Rovers
Association football player non-biographical articles